Sanātana Dharma (Devanagari: , meaning "eternal dharma", "eternal order") is an endonym used by Hindus to refer to Hinduism. It refers to the “eternal” truth and teachings of Hinduism. It can also be translated as “the natural and eternal way to live". The term is used in Indian languages alongside the more common Hindu Dharma for Hinduism. Sanatana Dharma can also denote the list of 'eternal' or absolute duties and practices.

Etymology
In Sanskrit, Sanātana Dharma  translates approximately to "eternal law" or, less literally, "eternal way." In Pali, the equivalent term is Dhammo Sanātano (धम्मो सनन्तनो). In Hindi, the Sanskrit tatsama dharm धर्म is being used as "religion" (सनातन धर्म) roughly translates to "eternal truth".

Dharma is often translated as "duty", "religion" or "religious duty", but has a deeper meaning. The word comes from the Sanskrit root "dhri" which means "to sustain" or "that which is integral to something" (e.g. dharma of sugar is to be sweet, fire to be hot). A person's dharma consists of duties that sustain them according to their innate characteristics which are both spiritual and material, generating two corresponding types:

 Sanatana-dharma – duties performed according to one's spiritual (constitutional) identity as atman (Self) and are thus the same for everyone. General duties include virtues such as honesty, refraining from injuring living beings, purity, goodwill, mercy, patience, forbearance, self-restraint, generosity, and asceticism.
 Varnashrama-dharma ( Svadharma) – duties performed according to one's material (conditional) nature and are specific to the individual at that particular time. One's "own duty" according to his or her class or varna and stage of life should win when in conflict with Sanatana-dharma (e.g. A warrior injuring others as explained in Bhagavad Gita).

According to the notion of sanatana-dharma, the eternal and intrinsic inclination of the living entity (atman) is to perform seva (service). Sanatana-dharma, being transcendental, refers to universal and axiomatic laws that are beyond our temporary belief systems.

History
The phrase dharma sanātana occurs in classical Sanskrit literature, for example, in the  Manusmrti (4-138) and in the Bhagavata Purana.

In the late 19th century, the term was revived during the Hindu revivalism movement as a name for Hinduism as a religion in order to avoid having to use the term "Hindu" which is of non-native Persian origin.

Today, Sanatana Dharma is associated only with Hinduism. In current-day usage, the term  sanatana dharma is diminished and used to emphasize a "traditional” or sanatani ("eternalist") outlook in contrast to the socio-political Hinduism embraced by movements such as the Arya Samaj. In sharp contrast to the efforts by Lahore Sanatana Dharma Sabha to preserve the Hindu tradition against the onslaught of reform, now it is being stressed that Sanatan Dharma cannot be rigid, it has to be inclusive without excluding the best and totality of knowledge to guide the karmic process, especially as Sanatan has no beginning and no end.

Competition with other denominations
Sanatanis and reformists (such as the Arya Samaj, the Radha Soamis and the Ramakrishna Mission) have competed for adherents for more than a century, sometimes creating deep schisms in Hindu society, as in the case of South African Hindus who were split between the Arya Samaj and Sanatanis. While the reformist groups were better organized initially, by the 1860s, a process of internal counter-reform was underway in Sanatani groups as well, and societies to propagate orthodox beliefs along modern lines emerged, such as Sanatan Dharm Rakshini Sabha in 1873. Some religious commentators have compared the Sanatani-Samaji dichotomy within Hinduism as similar to the Catholic-Protestant division in Christianity.

See also

Hindu idealism
Neo-Vedanta
Hindu revivalism

External links 

 What is Sanatan Dharma?
Sanatan Dharma - The power of boundless love

References

Hindu philosophical concepts
Sanskrit words and phrases
Indigenous Aryanism
Hinduism